Hard-clad silica (HCS) or polymer-clad fiber (PCF) is an optical fiber with a core of silica glass (diameter: 200 µm) and an optical cladding made of special plastic (diameter: 230 µm). In contrast to all-silica fiber, the core and cladding can be separated from each other. 

Due to their medium bandwidths and transmission rates of less than 100 Mbit/s, HCS fibers are suitable for distances of up to 2 km, e.g. in local networks in buildings and industry. Generally, the following applies: The higher the attenuation, the shorter the distance.

For comparison, plastic optical fibers (POF) have low bandwidths and transmission rates (typically 100 Mbit/s). They also have a high attenuation and therefore, the maximum distance is around 100 meters. Glass fibers on the other hand have very high bandwidths and transmission rates of up to GBit/s. The attenuation in glass fibres is much lower, glass fibers can cover distances of more than 10 km. Regarding bandwidth and distances, HCS fibers are situated between POF and multimode or singlemode fibers.

See also
Plastic-clad silica fiber

References  
 Bundschuh, Bernhard; Himmel, Jörg: Optische Informationsübertragung. Oldenbourg Verlag, München, Wien 2003 
 Eberlein, Dieter und 4 Mitautoren: Lichtwellenleiter-Technik. 4., neu bearbeitete und erweiterte Auflage, Expert Verlag 2002 
 Ch. Beha GmbH: Fibel der Lichtwellenleitertechnik

External links  
 Hard Clad Silica at Photonics 
 Hard Clad Silica at ITWissen

Optical fiber